Nogometni klub Ankaran, commonly referred to as NK Ankaran or simply Ankaran, was a Slovenian football club from Koper. The club was founded in 1966 as NK Galeb and was located in Ankaran until 2017, when they relocated to Koper. The club was dissolved following the 2018–19 season due to financial debt.

Honours

Slovenian Third League
 Winners: 2012–13

Littoral League (fourth tier)
 Winners: 1996–97, 2008–09

League history since 1991

References

External links
Soccerway profile

Association football clubs established in 1966
Association football clubs disestablished in 2019
Defunct football clubs in Slovenia
Football clubs in Yugoslavia
1966 establishments in Slovenia
2019 disestablishments in Slovenia